James Clifford John Keohane (born 22 January 1991) is an Irish professional footballer who plays as a midfielder for Rochdale.

Playing career
Keohane began his football career in with youth teams Belvedere and Evergreen.

Wexford Youths
In 2009, Keohane joined League of Ireland First Division side Wexford Youths making his League of Ireland debut as a substitute on the opening day of the season.

During his first season, Keohane scored 2 league goals in 16 appearances.

Bristol City
On 13 August 2010, Keohane signed for Championship side Bristol City on a one-year contract for a reported €100,000.

In November 2010, Keohane signed a one-month loan deal at Southern League Division One South & West side Clevedon Town.

Exeter City
On 17 August 2011, Keohane signed for then League One side Exeter City on a free transfer after being released by Bristol City. He had impressed on trial in friendlies against Derby County and Chippenham Town.

Keohane made his professional debut on 24 August 2011, in the League Cup 3–1 defeat to Liverpool at St James Park, coming on as a first-half substitute for the injured Guillem Bauzà.

Keohane signed a new one-year contract with Exeter City in June 2012.

In 2012–13, Keohane scored his first goal for Exeter in a 2–1 win over York City at Bootham Crescent.

At the end of the 2013–2014 season, Keohane was rewarded with an extended contract. In pre-season 2014–15, Keohane was handed the number 10 jersey following the departure of Alan Gow. Keohane was also the club's top scorer in their pre-season tour of Brazil, netting 2 goals in 3 games.

He left the club at the end of the 2014–2015 season due to lack of game time.

Woking
On 30 August 2015, Keohane joined National League side Woking on a six-month deal upon his contract expiry from Exeter City. A day later, Keohane made his debut against Welling United, and scored after coming on as a Substitute.

After only making seven league starts and eight substitute appearances in the league for the Cards, Woking decided against extending his contract, so therefore he was released after the 2–1 victory over Aldershot Town.

Sligo Rovers
On 8 January 2016, Keohane joined Irish side Sligo Rovers until the end of the 2016 season. On 6 February 2016, Keohane was given the number 17 jersey ahead of the 2016 campaign.

Cork City
On 11 November 2016, Keohane joined Cork City.

Rochdale
On 1 February 2019, Keohane joined Rochdale until the end of the season.

He was offered a new contract by Rochdale at the end of the 2018–19 season.

On 1 July 2019, Keohane signed a new two-year contract with Rochdale.

On 25 June 2021, Keohane signed a new two-year contract.

Career statistics

Honours
Individual
Rochdale Player of the Year: 2020–21

References

External links

1991 births
Sportspeople from Aylesbury
Living people
League of Ireland players
Republic of Ireland association footballers
Republic of Ireland youth international footballers
Association football midfielders
Bristol City F.C. players
Clevedon Town F.C. players
Exeter City F.C. players
English Football League players
Wexford F.C. players
Sligo Rovers F.C. players
Cork City F.C. players
Belvedere F.C. players
Rochdale A.F.C. players
Footballers from Buckinghamshire